Ningbo–Zhoushan high-speed railway is a high-speed railway under construction in Zhejiang Province, China. It is expected to open in 2028.

History
The preliminary design of the railway was approved in November 2020. Construction began on 22 December 2020.

The line includes a 16.2 km undersea tunnel.

Stations
The line has the following stations:
 (located near Ailiu station on Line 4 of Ningbo Rail Transit)
 (branch)

References

Railway lines in China